Vladimir Alekseyevich Andreyev (27 August 1930 – 29 August 2020) was a Soviet and Russian actor, theater director, and pedagogue. Laureate of the State Prize of the RSFSR (1980). People's Artist of the USSR (1985).

Academician of the Academy of Humanities (1995). Full member of the International Theater Academy (2000).

His wife was Natalya Seleznyova (born 1945), actress of theater and cinema, People's Artist of the Russian Federation (1996).

He was awarded Golden Mask award for Outstanding Contribution to the Development of Theatrical Art (2018).

He died two days after his 90th birthday.

Filmography 
 True Friends (1954) as Komsomol member
Certificate of Maturity (1954) as Yurka
 Good Morning (1955) as Mitya Lastochkin
 Cruelty (1959) as Yakov Uzelkov
Until Next Spring (1960) as Vasily
 The Tale of Tsar Saltan (1966) as Tsar Saltan
  Bastards (2006) as Kot in old age
 The Circus Princess (2008) as Pavel Fedotov
Lev Yashin. The Goalee of My Dreams (2019) as Mishurin's father

References

External links

 
 Владимир Андреев на сайте театра им. Ермоловой

1930 births
2020 deaths
20th-century Russian male actors
21st-century Russian male actors
Male actors from Moscow
Theatre directors from Moscow
Communist Party of the Soviet Union members
Russian Academy of Theatre Arts alumni
Honored Artists of the RSFSR
People's Artists of the RSFSR
People's Artists of the USSR
Full Cavaliers of the Order "For Merit to the Fatherland"
Recipients of the Order of Friendship of Peoples
Recipients of the Order of Honour (Russia)
Recipients of the Order of the Red Banner of Labour
Russian drama teachers
Russian male film actors
Russian male stage actors
Soviet drama teachers
Soviet male film actors
Soviet male stage actors
Soviet theatre directors
Burials in Troyekurovskoye Cemetery